James Richardson Comer Jr.  (born August 19, 1972) is an American politician from the Commonwealth of Kentucky who represents the commonwealth's 1st congressional district in the United States House of Representatives. As the chair of the Oversight Committee from 2023, Comer has declined or stopped investigations into former President Donald Trump, instead starting investigations into President Joe Biden and his family.

Comer served as Kentucky's agriculture commissioner from 2012 to 2016 and in the Kentucky House of Representatives from 2000 to 2012. He unsuccessfully sought the Republican nomination for governor of Kentucky in the 2015 election. On November 8, 2016, Comer won both a full term to the seat for the next Congress and a special election that allowed him to serve the remainder of Whitfield's term.

Early life and education
Comer is a native of Carthage, Tennessee. He grew up in Monroe County, Kentucky, graduating from Monroe County High School, Tompkinsville, Kentucky, in 1990. He received a BS in Agriculture from Western Kentucky University in 1993. In college he served as president of the Kentucky Future Farmers of America. After college, he and his family started James Comer, Jr. Farms, a  farm, and he also co-owns Comer Land & Cattle Co. He served as a director of the South Central Bank for 12 years. Comer served as president of the Monroe County Chamber of Commerce from 1999 to 2000.

Kentucky politics

Kentucky House of Representatives 
In 2000, Comer was elected to the Kentucky House of Representatives at the age of 27.

Kentucky Commissioner of Agriculture

In 2011, Comer ran for agriculture commissioner. The incumbent, Richie Farmer, was term-limited. In the election, Comer was the only Republican to win election to a statewide executive office, and worked with a team of Democratic officials and under a Democratic governor. He had the highest percentage of the vote of any candidate on the ballot, and raised $606,766 to his opponent's $204,287. He took office in January 2012. One of Comer's first actions in office was to team up with Democratic Auditor Adam Edelen to investigate his Republican predecessor's ethics while in office.

That year Comer, became chair of the Kentucky Industrial Hemp Commission, and shortly after taking office, he called the legalization of industrialized hemp his top priority, and was "instrumental in getting the hemp industry up and running", including by founding several pilot programs in an effort to restart Kentucky's industrial hemp industry. He also filed suit against the DEA, which resulted in the DEA allowing hemp seeds to be delivered to Kentucky farmers for the first new crops. Between 2014 and 2015, Kentucky's hemp crops grew from 33 to 1,700 acres. Comer also advocated for national hemp deregulation.

Comer founded the Kentucky Proud Farm to Campus program, and created a mobile science centers program for primary and secondary school students to learn about agricultural sciences.

2015 gubernatorial election

On August 2, 2014, during the annual Fancy Farm picnic, Comer announced he would seek the Republican nomination for governor of Kentucky in the 2015 election. His running mate was State Senator Christian McDaniel. At the conclusion of voting in the May 19 election, Comer was 83 votes behind businessman Matt Bevin. The Associated Press, calling the race a "virtual tie", did not call it for either candidate. Comer refused to concede and said he would request a recanvass. The request was filed with the Kentucky Secretary of State's office on May 20, with Secretary of State Alison Lundergan Grimes ordering the recanvass to begin at 9:00 a.m. on May 28. After the recanvass, Grimes announced that Bevin remained 83 votes ahead of Comer. She also said that should Comer want a full recount, it would require a court order from the Franklin Circuit Court. On May 29, Comer announced he would not request a recount and conceded the nomination to Bevin.

U.S. House of Representatives

Elections

2016

In 2016, Comer entered the Republican primary election for the 1st congressional district of Kentucky against two other competitors. Before the primary, he was endorsed by the National Rifle Association and the US Chamber of Commerce. He won the primary with 60.6% of the vote. Comer was elected to the House with 72.6% of the vote. Since Whitfield had resigned in September, Comer actually ran in two elections on November 8–a special election for the last two months of Whitfield's 11th term, and a regular election for a full two-year term. Comer won both elections over Democratic nominee Samuel L. Gaskins with over 72% of the vote. He was sworn in soon after the results were certified, giving him two months' more seniority over the rest of the 2017 freshman class.

Tenure
During his first few months in office, Comer held several town hall meetings, where he discussed the Congress's early platform. He partnered with Murray State University to form the Congressman James Comer Congressional Agriculture Fellowship program, and advocated for agricultural legislation reform. He criticized the regulatory policies of Barack Obama, and supported the early domestic policies and actions of President Donald Trump. Comer is a social conservative on same-sex marriage and abortion. He believes the trade embargo on Cuba should be lifted.

Comer voted for the Tax Cuts and Jobs Act of 2017. After the bill passed, he said: "I am proud to support this critical part of President Trump's pro-growth agenda that will fulfill this promise to the American people who have struggled under the weight of Washington bureaucrats for far too long."

Comer was an original cosponsor of the Hemp Farming Act, which legalized hemp nationwide and removed federal regulations on the crop. The bill was later included in the Agriculture Improvement Act of 2018 and signed into law by President Trump on December 20, 2018. Comer was a member of the conference committee that negotiated its final version.

At the outset of the COVID-19 pandemic, Comer and Representative Suzanne Bonamici introduced legislation that would protect access to school lunches for school districts throughout the country that had to close because of the pandemic. The COVID–19 Child Nutrition Response Act allows the Department of Agriculture (USDA) to waive requirements for children to gather at schools in order for school officials and food service personnel to distribute reimbursable, nutritious meals. It also gives local school officials discretion over substitutions for meal components if supply or procurement is disrupted. When introducing the bill, Comer said, "this bill is a critical step toward ensuring that our students maintain access to the school meals they rely on for their health and well-being". After it cleared the House and Senate, President Trump signed the legislation into law on March 18.

After the 2022 United States House of Representatives election resulted in a House Republican majority, Comer said that the House Oversight Committee's "focus in this next Congress" would be to investigate President Joe Biden, particularly his "relationship with his family's foreign partners and whether he is a president who is compromised or swayed by foreign dollars and influence".

After Comer became chair of the Oversight Committee, he responded in January 2023 to the Joe Biden classified documents incident by calling for visitor logs for Biden's residence, where Biden's lawyers found some classified documents from his vice presidency; the same day, Comer said that he would not call for visitor logs for Trump's residence Mar-a-Lago, where an FBI search found classified documents from Trump's presidency despite Trump's lawyers' claim that no such documents were there. Comer declared he would investigate Biden because Biden "hasn’t been investigated", adding: "there have been so many investigations of President Trump. I don’t feel like we need to spend a whole lot of time investigating President Trump".

In March 2023, Comer confirmed that he had ended a House investigation into Trump's financial dealings, in which Trump's former accounting company, Mazars USA, had been turning over documents as part of a court-supervised settlement; the documents provided information on how foreign governments patronized the Trump International Hotel. Comer said he "didn’t even know who or what Mazars was" and that he was instead investigating "money the Bidens received from China."

Committee assignments
Committee on Education and Labor
Subcommittee on Civil Rights and Human Services (Ranking Member)
Subcommittee on Higher Education and Workforce Investment
Committee on Oversight and Reform (Chair)

Committee on Agriculture
Subcommittee on Biotechnology, Horticulture, and Research
Subcommittee on Livestock and Foreign Agriculture

Caucus memberships
Second Amendment Caucus
Republican Study Committee

Political positions

Health care

Comer supports the repeal of the Affordable Care Act ("Obamacare").

Economic issues 

In 2016 Comer called the Obama administration's final budget a "disaster in the making". In 2017, he voted for the Tax Cuts and Jobs Act, which was estimated to add $1.49 trillion to the national debt.

Comer opposes paid parental leave for federal workers.

Immigration

Comer opposes amnesty and sanctuary cities. He supports Executive Order 13767, the building of a wall along the Mexico–U.S. border.

Abortion 

Comer is anti-abortion.

Marijuana 

Comer supports declassifying marijuana as a Schedule 1 narcotic and growing hemp. In December 2017, he said there is "simply not enough support for medical marijuana legalization across the board".

LGBT rights 

Comer opposes same-sex marriage. He also opposes banning discrimination based on sexual orientation and gender identity, and voted against the Equality Act in 2019. Comer voted against the Respect for Marriage Act in 2022.

Iraq 

In June 2021, Comer was one of 49 House Republicans to vote to repeal the AUMF against Iraq.

Syria 
In 2023, Comer was among 47 Republicans to vote in favor of H.Con.Res. 21 which directed President Joe Biden to remove U.S. troops from Syria within 180 days.

Electoral history

Personal life
Comer is married to Tamara Jo "TJ" Comer and has three children. He was baptized at First Baptist Church of Tompkinsville and is a member of Elkhorn Baptist Church in Midway, Kentucky.

On May 5, 2015, Comer was accused of physical and mental abuse by Marilyn Thomas, a woman he dated while attending Western Kentucky University in 1993. He has said he believes the accusation was a political stunt to hinder his gubernatorial campaign.

References

External links

Congressman James Comer official U.S. House website
Campaign site

 

|-

|-

|-

|-

1972 births
21st-century American politicians
Baptists from Kentucky
Baptists from the United States
Kentucky Commissioners of Agriculture
Living people
Republican Party members of the Kentucky House of Representatives
People from Carthage, Tennessee
People from Tompkinsville, Kentucky
Republican Party members of the United States House of Representatives from Kentucky
Western Kentucky University alumni